Exclusive Session is a live EP album by American singer-songwriter Tori Amos. The EP is the artist's first release exclusively through iTunes. Exclusive Session was initially available in May 2005 for UK and Germany iTunes Stores only, followed by United States stores in June 2005.

Track listing

Personnel
Tori Amos – piano and vocals

References

2005 EPs
ITunes-exclusive releases
Live EPs
Tori Amos live albums
Tori Amos EPs
2005 live albums